Shrewsbury Historic District is a national historic district located at Shrewsbury, Pennsylvania in York County, Pennsylvania. The district includes 152 contributing buildings in the central business district and surround residential areas of Shrewsbury. A few of the buildings are log dwelling built before 1800.  Notable non-residential buildings include the Odd Fellows Hall (1853) and two Romanesque Revival churches.

It was listed on the National Register of Historic Places in 1984.

References 

Historic districts on the National Register of Historic Places in Pennsylvania
Federal architecture in Pennsylvania
Greek Revival architecture in Pennsylvania
Historic districts in York County, Pennsylvania
National Register of Historic Places in York County, Pennsylvania